RekenTest is educational software to practice, analyze and test mental calculation skills in arithmetic operations such as addition and subtraction, the multiplication tables, decimals, money problems, percentages and fractions.

Features
Session
In a session the software offers arithmetic problems one by one. The following types are supported:

Task
The software has many settings to specify the exact problems the user will get and how a session looks like. A task encapsulates all these settings and can be assigned to the session in one of the following ways:
 Show wizard
 Select from list of tasks
 Use a predefined task.

Problem sources
The software can create arithmetic problems in one or more of the following ways:
 The software generates problems (using task settings)
 The user defines custom problems
 The software generates remedial problems (for practice with a difficult problem).

Report
After each session a printable report is created.

Network
A client- and server-version of the software is available to use the software with multiple computers in a network (usually in a school). A purchased license is required to use this feature.

Languages
Supported languages are: English, Spanish, Portuguese and Dutch. The software can be translated into another language by adding a new language file.

License
Mozilla Public License v2.0

System requirements
 Windows 2000 or later
 A display with 800x600 pixels and high color (16-bit)
 8 MB free harddisk space
 64 MB RAM memory

Version history
Version 4.4, released in July 2016
Version 4.3, released in May 2015
Version 4.2, released in September 2013
Version 4.1, released in April 2012
Version 4.0.2, released in May 2011
Version 4.0.1.1, released in November 2010
Version 4.0.1, released in August 2010
Version 3.0.5.1, released in March 2010
Version 3.0.5, released in February 2010
Version 3.0.4, released in September 2008
Version 3.0.3, released in March 2007
Version 3.0.2, released in September 2006
Version 3.0.1, released in July 2006
Version 3, released in June 2006.

References

External links
Official website RekenTest
Source code

Free software
Educational software
Software for teachers
Pascal (programming language) software